Homeguard Products (New Zealand) Ltd v Kiwi Packaging Ltd [1981] 2 NZLR 322 was a case of the High Court of New Zealand, regarding whether the banking of cheques tendered as full settlement of disputed accounts. The High Court ruled that by banking the debtor's cheque, Kiwi Packaging consented to the terms attached to the cheque.

Background
Kiwi Packaging supplied Homeguard with packaging materials. For unexplained reasons, a dispute arose between the parties just what the final balance owing was. This was not helped by Kiwi Packaging giving different amounts as the final balance, ranging from $901.84 to $1,187.60.

Homeguard thought the balance was even less than these amounts, with their calculation being for $765.97, and as a consequence, sent Kiwi Packaging a cheque for $765.97 with a note attached saying this amount was tendered "in full settlement of our account".

Kiwi Packaging, despite banking the cheque, sued Homeguard for the balance of $136 in the District Court, and won judgment for the balance remaining. Homeguard appealed to the High Court.

Decision
By banking the debtor’s cheque, Kiwi Packaging in effect consented to the terms attached to the cheque. Accordingly, the judge ruled that accord and satisfaction occurred, resulting in the debt being legally extinguished upon the creditor's banking of the cheque. Barker J said: 
The court was silent on just how long "promptly" might mean.

References

High Court of New Zealand cases
1981 in case law
1981 in New Zealand law
New Zealand contract case law